Ghazi Kanaan (1942 – 12 October 2005), also known as Abu Yo'roub, was Syria's interior minister from 2004 to 2005, and long-time head of Syria's security apparatus in Lebanon. His violent death during an investigation into the assassination of Rafik Hariri drew international attention.

Early life and education
Ghazi Kanaan was born in 1942 in Bhamra, near Qardaha, the home town of former Syrian president Hafez al-Assad. This region, centered on the coastal town of Latakia, is in heartland Syria's Alawite minority, of which both men were part. Ghazi was a member of the Kalbiyya tribe and a distant relative of Bashar's mother, Anisa Makhlouf. Ghazi graduated from the Homs Military Academy in 1965.

Career and activities
Ghazi, as a young military officer, pledged allegiance to Hafez al-Assad, who seized power in 1970. Ghazi participated in the fight against the Israelis on the Golan Heights in the 1970s. He rose in rank to colonel and served as the director of intelligence in of Central Syria (Homs) from 1981 to 1982.

After the Israeli invasion of Lebanon, parts of which were already under Syrian military domination, he was assigned to head the Syrian intelligence in Lebanon in 1982. His term lasted for twenty years until 2002. However, Ghazi did not leave Lebanon until a ceremony was held by then Lebanese prime minister Rafik Hariri at the prime ministry on 9 October 2003, and when Hariri symbolically gave him the key of the city.

During his tenure in Lebanon, Ghazi gained a decisive Syrian influence over Lebanese affairs, and gradually subdued the warring Lebanese militias through a combination of diplomacy, bribery and force. During the 1980s, he developed collaborators with the predominantly Christian and previously Lebanese Forces – Executive Command (LFEC) militia which was run by Elie Hobeika, but it was only about 2,000 soldiers. He also became a close confidant of Rafik Hariri. After Israel's withdrawal from its occupation of southern Lebanon in 2000, Ghazi extended Syria's influence there, and backed the Hezbollah movement's takeover of the area.

Syria established an absolute power in Lebanese elections of 1992, 1996 and 2000 through Ghazi. After the Taif agreement in 1989, it was Ghazi who determined fourteen electoral districts of Lebanon. On behalf of Syrian government, he vetoed the anti-Syrian candidates, urged the political leaders to include pro-Syrian candidates in their candidate lists, and balanced the number of religious candidates with secular ones in some districts. In addition, Syria exerted influence on security and judicial appointments in the country through Ghazi. On the other hand, the head of Lebanon's Sureté Générale (General Security Directorate), Jamil Al Sayyed, reported directly to Ghazi, often bypassing the civilian leadership of the Lebanese government. Ghazi became the most feared man in the Lebanon during his term, since he had the power to order the arrest and indefinite detention of anyone.

In 2000, the widow and children of Ira Weinstein who was killed in a February 1996 Hamas suicide bombing, filed a lawsuit against him as the head of Syrian military intelligence in Lebanon and then Syrian Defense Minister Mustafa Tlass charging that they were responsible for providing the perpetrators with material resources and training.

After being an early backer of Syrian president Bashar al-Assad as a successor to his father, Ghazi was in October 2002 summoned back to Damascus to become the head of Syria's political security directorate, replacing Adnan Badr Hassan in the post. He was succeeded in Lebanon by Rustum Ghazali, his deputy. In 2004, after a string of bombings targeting leading Hamas members given sanctuary in Syria, claimed by Syria to have been the work of Israeli intelligence, Ghazi was assigned by president al-Assad to the cabinet post of interior minister in October 2004 in a cabinet rehuffle. The cabinet was headed by Muhammad Naji al-Otari. On the internal Syrian political scene, Ghazi was considered close to the president, although at the same time part of the "old guard" of Syrian politics.

On 30 June 2005, the United States, which had been pressuring Syria over the Hariri bombing and to end Syrian occupation, declared that it would freeze all assets belonging to Ghazi and Ghazali, due to their involvement with the occupation of Lebanon, and also due to suspicions of "corrupt activities".

Ghazi was not regarded as a member of Bashar al-Assad's inner circle. He was known to have close links with the former vice president, Abdul Halim Khaddam who had resigned in the summer of 2005. Some believed that they both might have developed a challenging powerbase within the Syrian Regional Branch of the Arab Socialist Ba'ath Party against Bashar al-Assad in future.

Business activities
Ghazi Kanaan was one of the shareholders of LibanCell, a cellular phone company. The company was awarded a ten-year contract in 1994.

Personal life
Ghazi was married and had six children, four sons and two daughters. One of his sons, Yaroob, is married to daughter of Jamil al-Assad.

Ghazi provided financial support to build the Jaafar Tayar mosque, established a library with seven computers and built a community center named for his father, Mohammed Ali in Bhamra. In short, he provided personal funding for community projects in Bhamra and nearby region.

Death
Ghazi was interviewed in September 2005 by a United Nations team led by Detlev Mehlis, as a "witness", probing the assassination of former Lebanese Prime Minister Rafik Hariri. Ghazi however denied any involvement in the assassination. In the phone interview he gave to the Lebanese radio station Voice of Lebanon on the day of his death, he said, "I think this is the last statement I might give."

Syrian interior ministry and other officials reported that Ghazi died in a Damascus hospital of a gunshot wound to the head on 12 October 2005. After a one-day examination, Syrian authorities closed the case, Prosecutor Muhammad al-Luaji stating:

"Examination of the body and fingerprints as well as testimony from employees, including senior aide General Walid Abaza, indicated that it was a suicide by gunshot"

It was suggested that he was in fact murdered by the Syrian government, and various theories explaining the possible motives for this have been put forth. For instance, Ghazi's death is seen as a move to cut a key connection to the alleged Syrian participation in the assassination of Rafik Hariri. Lebanese Druze leader Walid Jumblatt, who had been variously allied and hostile to Ghazi during his stay in Lebanon, commented by saying that if Ghazi Kanaan was in fact linked to the Hariri assassination, then he was a "brave man" who "did well, if I may say, by committing suicide". There was another argument: Ghazi was in touch with Abdel Halim Khaddam and Hikmat Shihabi and they were planning a coup against Bashar al-Assad.

It is argued that his death was widely blamed on the al-Assad government among the Alawite community. This belief led to further dissolution of Alawite ‘asabiyya'. At his funeral, mourners shouted, "Why did you kill him?".

In November 2006, Ghazi's brother also committed suicide.

References

External links

1942 births
2005 deaths
Homs Military Academy alumni
Syrian ministers of interior
Syrian colonels
Syrian politicians who committed suicide
Syrian Alawites
Arab Socialist Ba'ath Party – Syria Region politicians
Suicides by firearm in Syria
Directors of intelligence agencies
People from Latakia Governorate